Ralph Hodge (April 28, 1953 – November 29, 2018) was an American college basketball head coach for Olivet Nazarene University.

Career 
Hodge became the head coach at Olivet Nazarene in 1979. He is one of only 78 college head coaches to win 600 games. As of 2012, Hodge's 671 wins at the school placed him third on the all-time list for NAIA Division II.

Personal life 
Hodge died on November 29, 2018 at the age of 65.

References

1953 births
2018 deaths
American men's basketball coaches
Basketball coaches from Illinois
College men's basketball head coaches in the United States
Olivet Nazarene Tigers men's basketball coaches
Olivet Nazarene Tigers men's basketball players
Sportspeople from Decatur, Illinois
American men's basketball players
20th-century Methodists